is a Japanese actor. He goes by the nickname, Kura.

He has a younger sister, Mariko Kuranuki, who is also a Japanese actress.

TV shows
 Ressha Sentai ToQger (Toei, 2014) - Teruo Izai/Coin Shadow
 怪談弐　職場怪談
 Kin'iro no Tsubasa (Fuji TV, 2007)
 警部補・藤井若葉の癒しの事件簿～犯罪被害者相談室から～（梶信二）
  (2006)
 Brother Beat (TBS, 2005)
  (TV Tokyo, 2005)
 いちばん暗いのは夜明け前（シンジ）
 Gokusen 2 (NTV, 2005)
 Vampire Host (TV Asahi, 2004)
 Hatchōbori no Shichinin (TV Asahi, 2004)
 Water Boys (Fuji TV, 2003)
 ダムド・ファイル（星山省吾）
 Mirai Sentai Timeranger (Toei, 2000–01) - Shion/Time Green
  (Fuji TV, 1998)
 Sore ga Kotae da! (Fuji TV, 1997)
 Shōri no Megami (Fuji TV, 1996)
 Ai no Gekijō - "Ohisama ga Ippai" (TBS, 1996)

Movies
 Kito Kito! (2007)
 Mirai Sentai Timeranger vs. Go Go V (Toei, 2001)
 SLIM SIZE ME！！
 美しい夏・キリシマ（宮脇稔）
 キル・鬼ごっこ（ショウゴ）
 杉に生きる（徹）
 萌えよ！ドラゴンガールズ（長澤龍太）
 TWILIGHT FILEシリーズ　第2話★あの頃・・・Summer Memories（風間亮）
 アイ、マイ、ミー、マイン（裕真）

Musical
 Rock Musical BLEACH No Clouds in the Blue Heaven - Kaname Tosen
 Rock Musical BLEACH Live Bankai Show code: 002 - Kaname Tosen
 Rock Musical BLEACH The All - Kaname Tosen
 Rock Musical BLEACH Live Bankai Show code: 003 - Kaname Tosen
 以蔵のいちばん長い日（沖田総司・亀吉※二役）
 姫山恋花簪
 歌舞伎町フルモンティ
 ドカチン
 えにし
 ちんどん
 シンクロニシティ
 ドカチン～下北沢死闘編～

External links
Official Website
Official Blog

Year of birth missing (living people)
Living people
Japanese male actors